The Capitole de Toulouse, commonly known as the Capitole, is the heart of the municipal administration of the French city of Toulouse and its city hall.


History and description 

It is not the same Capitol as the one where St Saturninus was martyred, the latter referring to the Capitoline temple of the Roman city, while the first buildings of the current Capitole were erected on this site in the 12th century.

The Capitouls (governing magistrates) of Toulouse embarked on the construction of the original building in 1190 to provide a seat for the government of a province growing in wealth and influence. The name "Capitole" referred not only to the Roman Capitol but also to the capitulum, which was the chapter of the governing magistrates. It was a centre of contention during the 1562 Toulouse Riots, with Huguenot forces holding it with captured cannon.

In the first half of the 19th century, the structures surrounding the vast (2 ha)  Place du Capitole were redesigned, but the current façade, 135 m long and built of the characteristic pink brick in Neoclassical style, dates from 1750, built according to plans by Guillaume Cammas. The eight columns represent the original eight capitouls. In 1873, Eugène Viollet-le-Duc built a bell tower typical of the style of northern France on top of the donjon of the building. It was in this donjon that Jean Calas, a Protestant victim of a religiously-biased trial, was interrogated. Only the Henri IV courtyard and gate survive from the original medieval buildings. It was in this courtyard that the Duke de Montmorency was decapitated after his rebellion against Cardinal Richelieu. A thorough redesign of the Place du Capitole in 1995 reserved the space for pedestrians. Some of the interior of the Capitole can be traced back to the 16th century. Today the Capitole houses the city hall, as well as the Théâtre du Capitole de Toulouse opera company and the Orchestre national du Capitole de Toulouse. The Salle des Illustres contains 19th century works of art.

Gallery

See also
 List of the mayors of Toulouse
 Parliament of Toulouse

References

Citations

Bibliography
 .

Buildings and structures in Toulouse
Landmarks in France
Tourist attractions in Toulouse
City and town halls in France